Ryan Lonergan (born 6 April 1998) is an Australian rugby union footballer who plays for the Brumbies in Super Rugby. His regular playing position is scrum half. 

In 2016, Lonergan was selected for the Australian Schoolboys rugby union team in a tour of New Zealand and Samoa.

Lonergan played for the Australia national under-20 rugby union team in the 2017 Oceania Rugby Under 20 Championship.

Soon after leaving school in 2016, Lonergan was signed to a two-year contract.

Lonergan made his Super Rugby debut in 2017 in a match against the Chiefs in Hamilton, New Zealand.

References

External links
 

1998 births
Living people
ACT Brumbies players
Australian rugby union players
Rugby union scrum-halves
Canberra Vikings players